Rieter is a producer of textile machinery based in Winterthur, Switzerland.

History
Founded in 1795 by Johann Jacob Rieter (1762–1826), the company initially produced textile products. In 1806, as Napoleon imposed the Continental Blockade to prevent trade between Continental Europe and the United Kingdom, it became impossible for Rieter to get spare parts for its British textile machinery. As a consequence, the company started to produce spare parts themselves, and in 1810 the first self-designed textile machine left its workshop.

In 1982, Rieter acquired the British textile machinery company Ernest Scragg & Sons Ltd. The group took over Automatik (founded in 1947) in 1992.

In 2011, the automotive products division, formerly Rieter Automotive, separated from Rieter and became a new corporation; Autoneum. The two Board Members of Rieter, Peter Spuhler and Michael Pieper, have agreed to keep their shares in Autoneum for a certain agreed time period and to grant the new company a subordinated loan of 12.5 million CHF each.

On 30 June 2017, Rieter acquired SSM Textile Machinery Division (SSM) from Schweiter Technologies AG, Horgen (Switzerland) which now functions under the Rieter Component division. SSM deals in yarn winding equipment. SSM was formed by the merger of Schärer, Schweiter and Mettler companies in 1989. SSM took over Giudici S.p.A., Galbiate, Italy in February 2012 which is involved in false-twist texturing field machinery (fine count Nylon yarns). SSM also has a subsidiary in Zhongshan, China under the name of  SSM (Zhongshan) Ltd, which helps in sales/support/service operations and also handles, manufacturing & assembling of machines for asian markets

References

External links
Rieter official site

1795 establishments in Europe
18th-century establishments in the Old Swiss Confederacy
Manufacturing companies of Switzerland
Spinning
Textile machinery manufacturers
Companies based in Winterthur
Companies established in 1795
Companies listed on the SIX Swiss Exchange
Swiss brands